Julian Justus (born 29 January 1988) is a German sports shooter. He competed in the Men's 10 metre air rifle event at the 2012 Summer Olympics and the 2016 Olympics.

References

External links
 

1988 births
Living people
German male sport shooters
Olympic shooters of Germany
Shooters at the 2012 Summer Olympics
Shooters at the 2016 Summer Olympics
Sportspeople from Giessen
European Games competitors for Germany
Shooters at the 2015 European Games
Shooters at the 2019 European Games
20th-century German people
21st-century German people